Fawzia Abd Al-Minem Al-Ashmawi (Arabic: فوزية العشماوي) is an Egyptian academic, writer, and translator. She works as a Professor of Arabic Literature and Islamic Civilisation in the University of Geneva. She had won the Golden Award in Sciences and Arts from Egypt.

Early life 
Al-Ashmawi was born in October in the 1940s in Alexandria. Her mother was Egyptian with Syrian roots, and her father was Alexandrian from Al-Siyala neighbourhood in Ras Al-Teen district. She has two sisters and two brothers. She went to a convent school during primary school, and she went to Alexandria University where she studied in the Department of French Language in the College of Arts, from which she graduated in 1965. Abd Al-Aziz Abu Zaid was a colleague of hers, who proposed to her after she graduated, then they got married afterwards.

In the summer of 1972, when she was in her thirties, Al-Ashmawi left Egypt for the first time in her life and headed to Switzerland. Her husband had already left six months earlier before she and her two children followed. Al-Ashmawi continued her studies in social sciences there until she graduated from the College of Arts in University of Geneva in June 1972. Continuing her studies, she received her MA in 1974, and her PhD in 1983 in Arts, Humanities and Social Sciences. Her MA thesis was about Prophet Mohammed’s personality in French Literature, while her PhD dissertation was Woman and Modern Egypt in the Work of Naguib Mahfuz.

Al-Ashmawi worked as a translator and counsellor in some bodies of the United Nations in Switzerland, and for ISESCO and UNESCO. She also worked as a cultural counsellor in the Embassy of Saudi Arabia, then for that of the United Arab Emirates in Geneva. She got promoted from the position of an assistant professor to become the Head of the Arabic Language and Islamic Studies Department in University of Geneva.

Positions 
She held several positions:
 Head of the Arabic Language and Islamic Studies Department in University of Geneva
 Counsellor in the United Nations in Switzerland
 Cultural counsellor for the Embassy of Saudi Arabia in Geneva
 Cultural counsellor for the Embassy of the United Arab Emirates in Geneva
 President of the European Muslim Women Forum
 Secretary General of the Swiss-Egyptian Cultural Association
 Senior Researcher for ISESCO in Rabat, Morocco, 2005; project: The Image of Islam in European Textbooks
 Senior Researcher for UNESCO in Paris 2007; project: The Image of the Other in History Textbooks | 2006; project: The Evolution of Muslim Women (Encyclopedia of Islam)

Works 
She has several publications:

Arabic 

 Waves of  Life between the Alexandrian Sea and Lake Geneva (Original title: Amwaj Al-'Umur bain Bahr Al-Iskandariya wa Buhairat Jenef), Dar el-ain Publications, Cairo, 2012
 Muslim Women in the Occident Media (Original title: Al-Mar’a Al-Muslima fì Al-`Ilam Al-Gharbi), Akhbar al-youm, Cairo, 2008
 Islamic Values and Humanitarian Values (Original title: Al-Qiyam Al-Islamiyya wa al-Qiyam Al-Insaniyya), Doha Conference, Qatar, 2007
 Women in Naguîb Mahfuz Novels (Original title: Al-Maraa fî Adab Naguib Mahfuz), General Egyptian Organisation of book & Superior Council of Culture, Cairo, 2003
  The Seven Monks of Alexandria (Original title: Al-Saba` Banât fî Al-Iskandiriyya), Sharqiyyat, Cairo, 1998
 Al-Hub Al-Awal wa Al-Suhba, (translation from French short story Premier Amour of Samuel Beckett), Superior Council of Culture, Cairo, 1998
 Alexandrie 60, Madbouly, Cairo, 1997
 Stranger in my Country (Original title: Ghareeb fi Watani), Madbouly, Cairo, 1995
 Al-Hub (Love), (translation from the French novel of Marguerite Duras L’Amant), General Organisation of Culture, Cairo, 1995
 Islam and Globalisation (Original title: Al-Islam wa Al-Áwlama), High Council of Islamic Affairs, Cairo, 1999
 The Status of Women in Islam (Original title: Makanat Al-Mar’a fi Al-Islam), Conference on Uprooted Muslim Women in Islam, Sharjah, U.A.E., 1994

English 

 Learning about the Other, Guidebook for History Textbooks, Joint Project of UNESCO and Arab League, Cairo, 2009
 The Image of The Other in History Textbooks: Jews and Christians in Islamic Books, Istanbul, 2006
 The Arabic Language as an Official Language of The United Nations, Nitobe Symposium, Berlin, 1999
 Human Rights in Islam, Panorama, Bern, 1999
 Muslim Voices in Switzerland, TSER Project, Brussels, 1999
 Comparative Study of Textbooks: The Image of the Other in Seven Mediterranean Countries, UNESCO Publications, Newsletter No 5, 1996

French 

 Mariage et Divorce dans l’Egypte Ancienne (translation from Arabic of Marriage and Divorce in Ancient Egypt), Geuthner, Paris,2009
 Mohammad, Prophète de Dieu (The Prophet Mohammed), (translation from Arabic), WICS Publications, Tripoli, 2005
 L’Islam dans les manuels scolaires en Europe (Islam in History Textbooks), WICS Publications, Tripoli, 2003
 La Condition des Musulmans en Suisse (Muslims Status in Switzerland), CERA, Geneva, 2001
 Etude Comparative des manuels scolaires des pays méditerranéens (Comparative Study of History Textbooks in Mediterranean Countries), UNESCO, Paris, 1996
 L’Authenticité dans l’oeuvre romanesque de Naguib Mahfouz (The Authenticity in Naguib Mahfouz’ Novels), Revue of Arts & Translation, No 1, Kaslik, Liban, 1995
 La tragédie de Voltaire: Mahomet ou le Fanatisme ( Mahomet, The Fanaticism of Voltaire), in Campus, Geneva, 1994
 Miramar (translation from the Arabic novel Miramar by Naguib Mahfuz), Denoël, Paris, 1990
 La Femme et l’Egypte Moderne dans l’oeuvre de Naguib Mahfouz (Woman and Modern Egypt in Naguib Mahfuz Novels), Labor & Fides, Geneva, 1985

Awards 

 Golden Award in Sciences and Arts from Egypt (Wissam Al-Istihqaq min Al-Daraja Al-Ula fi Al –`Ulum wa Al-Funun)

References 

Egyptian translators

Egyptian writers
Egyptian women writers
Egyptian academics
Alexandria University alumni
Academic staff of the University of Geneva

1940s births
Living people
Year of birth uncertain